The Port Washington Tennis Academy, located on Long Island, New York. It was founded in 1966 as a non-profit tennis facility. John McEnroe (under coaches Tony Palafox and Stanley Matthews) and Vitas Gerulaitis developed their games here, and Australian coach Harry Hopman worked at the facility late in his life.

Further reading

External links
Official site

Tennis venues in New York (state)
Tennis academies
1966 establishments in New York (state)
Sports venues completed in 1966